In mathematics, a filter on a set  is a family  of subsets such that: 
  and 

A filter on a set may be thought of as representing a "collection of large subsets". Filters appear in order, model theory, set theory, but can also be found in topology, from which they originate. The dual notion of a filter is an ideal.

Filters were introduced by Henri Cartan in 1937 and as described in the article dedicated to filters in topology, they were subsequently used by Nicolas Bourbaki in their book Topologie Générale as an alternative to the related notion of a net developed in 1922 by E. H. Moore and Herman L. Smith. Order filters are generalizations of filters from sets to arbitrary partially ordered sets. Specifically, a filter on a set is just a proper order filter in the special case where the partially ordered set consists of the power set ordered by set inclusion.

Preliminaries, notation, and basic notions

In this article, upper case Roman letters like  denote sets (but not families unless indicated otherwise) and  will denote the power set of  A subset of a power set is called  (or simply) where it is  if it is a subset of  Families of sets will be denoted by upper case calligraphy letters such as  
Whenever these assumptions are needed, then it should be assumed that  is non–empty and that  etc. are families of sets over 

The terms "prefilter" and "filter base" are synonyms and will be used interchangeably.

Warning about competing definitions and notation

There are unfortunately several terms in the theory of filters that are defined differently by different authors. 
These include some of the most important terms such as "filter". 
While different definitions of the same term usually have significant overlap, due to the very technical nature of filters (and point–set topology), these differences in definitions nevertheless often have important consequences. 
When reading mathematical literature, it is recommended that readers check how the terminology related to filters is defined by the author. 
For this reason, this article will clearly state all definitions as they are used.  
Unfortunately, not all notation related to filters is well established and some notation varies greatly across the literature (for example, the notation for the set of all prefilters on a set) so in such cases this article uses whatever notation is most self describing or easily remembered.

The theory of filters and prefilters is well developed and has a plethora of definitions and notations, many of which are now unceremoniously listed to prevent this article from becoming prolix and to allow for the easy look up of notation and definitions. 
Their important properties are described later.

Sets operations

Nets and their tails

A  is a map from a non–empty directed set into  
The notation  will be used to denote a net with domain 

Warning about using strict comparison

If  is a net and  then it is possible for the set  which is called , to be empty (for example, this happens if  is an upper bound of the directed set ). 
In this case, the family  would contain the empty set, which would prevent it from being a prefilter (defined later). 

Filters and prefilters

The following is a list of properties that a family  of sets may possess and they form the defining properties of filters, prefilters, and filter subbases. Whenever it is necessary, it should be assumed that 

Many of the properties of  defined above and below, such as "proper" and "directed downward," do not depend on  so mentioning the set  is optional when using such terms. Definitions involving being "upward closed in " such as that of "filter on " do depend on  so the set  should be mentioned if it is not clear from context.

Basic examples 

Named examples

The dual ideal  is also called  (despite not actually being a filter). It is the only dual ideal on  that is not a filter on 

 is an  if  for some sequence 

The filter of tails generated by a sequence that is not eventually constant is necessarily  an ultrafilter. Every principal filter on a countable set is sequential as is every cofinite filter on a countably infinite set. The intersection of finitely many sequential filters is again sequential.

By definition, the infimum is the finest/largest (relative to ) filter contained as a subset of each member of  

Let  and let  
This dual ideal is  where  is the –system generated by  

Let  and let  
If it exists then necessarily  (as defined above) and  will also be equal to the intersection of all filters on  containing  
This supremum of  exists if and only if the dual ideal  is a filter on  
The least upper bound of a family of filters  may fail to be a filter. Indeed, if  contains at least 2 distinct elements then there exist filters  for which there does  exist a filter  that contains both  
If  is not a filter subbase then the supremum of  does not exist and the same is true of its supremum in  but their supremum in the set of all dual ideals on  will exist (it being the degenerate filter ).

The club filter of a regular uncountable cardinal is the filter of all sets containing a club subset of  It is a -complete filter closed under diagonal intersection.

Other examples

Let  and let  which makes  a prefilter and a filter subbase that is not closed under finite intersections.

Let  be a topological space,  and define  where  is necessarily finer than  If  is non–empty (resp. non–degenerate, a filter subbase, a prefilter, closed under finite unions) then the same is true of   If  is a filter on  then  is a prefilter but not necessarily a filter on  although  is a filter on  equivalent to 

The set  of all dense open subsets of a (non–empty) topological space  is a proper –system and so also a prefilter.

A filter subbase with no smallest prefilter containing it: In general, if a filter subbase  is not a –system then an intersection  of  sets from  will usually require a description involving  variables that cannot be reduced down to only two (consider, for instance  when ). This example illustrates an atypical class of a filter subbases  where all sets in both  and its generated –system can be described as sets of the form  so that in particular, no more than two variables (specifically) are needed to describe the generated –system.

For all  let 

where  always holds so no generality is lost by adding the assumption  
For all real  if  is non-negative then 
For every set  of positive reals, let

Let  and suppose  is not a singleton set.
If  are non−empty intervals then the filter subbases  generate the same filter on  if and only if 

Ultrafilters 

There are many other characterizations of "ultrafilter" and "ultra prefilter," which are listed in the article on ultrafilters. Important properties of ultrafilters are also described in that article.

Any non–degenerate family that has a singleton set as an element is ultra, in which case it will then be an ultra prefilter if and only if it also has the finite intersection property. 
The trivial filter  is ultra if and only if  is a singleton set.

The ultrafilter lemma

The following important theorem is due to Alfred Tarski (1930).

A consequence of the ultrafilter lemma is that every filter is equal to the intersection of all ultrafilters containing it. 
Assuming the axioms of Zermelo–Fraenkel (ZF), the ultrafilter lemma follows from the Axiom of choice (in particular from Zorn's lemma) but is strictly weaker than it. The ultrafilter lemma implies the Axiom of choice for finite sets. If  dealing with Hausdorff spaces, then most basic results (as encountered in introductory courses) in Topology (such as Tychonoff's theorem for compact Hausdorff spaces and the Alexander subbase theorem) and in functional analysis (such as the Hahn–Banach theorem) can be proven using only the ultrafilter lemma; the full strength of the axiom of choice might not be needed.

Kernels 

The kernel is useful in classifying properties of prefilters and other families of sets.

If  then for any point 

Properties of kernels 

If  then  and this set is also equal to the kernel of the –system that is generated by  
In particular, if  is a filter subbase then the kernels of all of the following sets are equal: 

If  is a map then  and  
Equivalent families have equal kernels.

Classifying families by their kernels 

If  is a principal filter on  then  and 

where  is also the smallest prefilter that generates 

In particular,  is a filter subbase if  is countable (for example,  the primes), a meager set in  a set of finite measure, or a bounded subset of  If  is a singleton set then  is a subbase for the Fréchet filter on 

The dual ideal  is called  of  while  is called  where at least one of these dual ideals is filter.

Finite prefilters and finite sets

If a filter subbase  is finite then it is fixed (that is, not free); 
this is because  is a finite intersection and the filter subbase  has the finite intersection property. 
A finite prefilter is necessarily principal, although it does not have to be closed under finite intersections.

If  is finite then all of the conclusions above hold for any  

However, on any infinite set there are non–trivial filter subbases and prefilters that are finite (although they cannot be filters). 

Characterizing fixed ultra prefilters 

Every principal prefilter is fixed, so a principal prefilter  is ultra if and only if  is a singleton set.

Every filter on  that is principal at a single point is an ultrafilter, and if in addition  is finite, then there are no ultrafilters on  other than these.

The next theorem shows that every ultrafilter falls into one of two categories: either it is free or else it is a principal filter generated by a single point.

Finer/coarser, subordination, and meshing

The preorder  that is defined below is of fundamental importance for the use of prefilters (and filters) in topology. For instance, this preorder is used to define the prefilter equivalent of "subsequence", where "" can be interpreted as " is a subsequence of " (so "subordinate to" is the prefilter equivalent of "subsequence of"). It is also used to define prefilter convergence in a topological space. 

 

Stated in plain English, the prefilter of tails of a subsequence is always subordinate to that of the original sequence. 
To see this, let  be arbitrary (or equivalently, let  be arbitrary) and it remains to show that this set contains some  
For the set  to contain  it is sufficient to have  
Since  are strictly increasing integers, there exists  such that  and so  holds, as desired. 
Consequently,  

For another example, if  is any family then  always holds and furthermore, 

Every filter subbase is coarser than both the –system that it generates and the filter that it generates.

If  are families such that  the family  is ultra, and  then  is necessarily ultra. It follows that any family that is equivalent to an ultra family will necessarily  ultra. In particular, if  is a prefilter then either both  and the filter  it generates are ultra or neither one is ultra. 
If a filter subbase is ultra then it is necessarily a prefilter, in which case the filter that it generates will also be ultra. If  is upward closed in  then 

Relational properties of subordination

The relation  is reflexive and transitive, which makes it into a preorder on  
The relation  is antisymmetric but if  has more than one point then it is  symmetric. 

: 
For any  
So the set  has more than one point if and only if the relation  is  symmetric.

: 
If  but while the converse does not hold in general, it does hold if  is upward closed (such as if  is a filter). 
For instance, if  is a prefilter but not a filter then

Equivalent families of sets

Every equivalence class other than  contains a unique representative (that is, element of the equivalence class) that is upward closed in 

Properties preserved between equivalent families

Let  be arbitrary and let  be any family of sets.
Not empty
Proper (that is,  is not an element)
 Moreover, any two degenerate families are necessarily equivalent.
Filter subbase
Prefilter
Free
Principal
Ultra
Is equal to the trivial filter 
 In words, this means that the only subset of  that is equivalent to the trivial filter  the trivial filter. In general, this conclusion of equality does not extend to non−trivial filters (one exception is when both families are filters).
Meshes with 
Is finer than 
Is coarser than 
Is equivalent to 

Missing from the above list is the word "filter" because this property is  preserved by equivalence. 
However, if  are filters on  then they are equivalent if and only if they are equal; this characterization does  extend to prefilters.

Equivalence of prefilters and filter subbases

If  is a prefilter on  then the following families are always equivalent to each other:
;

In particular, every prefilter is equivalent to the filter that it generates. 
By transitivity, two prefilters are equivalent if and only if they generate the same filter. 
Said differently, every equivalence class of prefilters contains exactly one representative that is a filter. 
In this way, filters can be considered as just being distinguished elements of these equivalence classes of prefilters.

A filter subbase that is  also a prefilter can be equivalent to the prefilter (or filter) that it generates. 
In contrast, every prefilter is equivalent to the filter that it generates. 
This is why prefilters can, by and large, be used interchangeably with the filters that they generate while filter subbases cannot. 
Every filter is both a –system and a ring of sets.

Examples of determining equivalence/non–equivalence

Examples: Let  and let  be the set  of integers (or the set ). Define the sets 

The set  is fixed while  is free (unless ). They satisfy  but no two of these families are equivalent; moreover, no two of the filters generated by these three filter subbases are equivalent/equal. This conclusion can be reached by showing that the –systems that they generate are not equivalent. Unlike with  every set in the –system generated by  contains  as a subset, which is what prevents their generated –systems (and hence their generated filters) from being equivalent.

Set theoretic properties and constructions

Trace and meshing

If  is ultra and if  mesh then the trace  is ultra. 

When prefilters mesh

Given non–empty families  the family

satisfies  and  
If  is proper (resp. a prefilter, a filter subbase) then this is also true of both  
In this case,  is a prefilter (resp. filter subbase) if and only if this is true of both  
Said differently, if  are prefilters then they mesh if and only if  is a prefilter. 
Generalizing gives a well known characterization of "mesh" entirely in terms of subordination (that is):

Two prefilters (resp. filter subbases)  mesh if and only if there exists a prefilter (resp. filter subbase)  such that  and 

If the least upper bound of two filters  exists in  then this least upper bound is equal to

Images and preimages under functions

Throughout,  will be maps between non–empty sets.

Images of prefilters

Let  Many of the properties that  may have are preserved under images of maps; notable exceptions include being upward closed, being closed under finite intersections, and being a filter, which are not necessarily preserved.

Filter properties: ultra, ultrafilter, filter, prefilter, filter subbase, dual ideal, upward closed, proper/non–degenerate.
Ideal properties: ideal, closed under finite unions, downward closed, directed upward.
Moreover, if  is a prefilter then so are both  
The image under a map  of an ultra set  is again ultra and if  is an ultra prefilter then so is 

If  is a filter then  is a filter on the range  but it is a filter on the codomain  if and only if  is surjective. 

Preimages of prefilters

Let  
Under the assumption that  is surjective:

 is a prefilter (resp. filter subbase, –system, closed under finite unions, proper) if and only if this is true of 

and consequently also:

For example:

 is a prefilter (resp. filter subbase, –system, proper) if and only if this is true of 

In this way, the case where  is not (necessarily) surjective can be reduced down to the case of a surjective function (which is a case that was described at the start of this subsection).

Even if  is an ultrafilter on  if  is not surjective then it is nevertheless possible that  which would make  degenerate as well. The next characterization shows that degeneracy is the only obstacle. If  is a prefilter then the following are equivalent:

 is a prefilter;
 is a prefilter;
;
 meshes with 

and moreover, if  is a prefilter then so is 

Bijections, injections, and surjections

All properties involving filters are preserved under bijections. This means that if  is a bijection, then  is a prefilter (resp. ultra, ultra prefilter, filter on  ultrafilter on  filter subbase, –system, ideal on  etc.) if and only if the same is true of 

A map  is injective if and only if for all prefilters  is equivalent to   The image of an ultra family of sets under an injection is again ultra.

Subordination is preserved by images and preimages

The relation  is preserved under both images and preimages of families of sets. 
This means that for  families  

Moreover, the following relations always hold for  family of sets : 

 
where equality will hold if  is surjective. 
Furthermore,

If  then 

and  where equality will hold if  is injective.

Products of prefilters

denote the canonical projection. 
Let  be non−empty families, also indexed by  such that  for each  
The  of the families  is defined identically to how the basic open subsets of the product topology are defined (had all of these  been topologies). That is, both the notations 

denote the family of all cylinder subsets  such that  for all but finitely many  and where  for any one of these finitely many exceptions (that is, for any  such that  necessarily ). 
When every  is a filter subbase then the family  is a filter subbase for the filter on  generated by  
 
for every  
However,  may fail to be a filter on  even if every  is a filter on

Set subtraction and some examples

Set subtracting away a subset of the kernel

If  is a prefilter on  then  is a prefilter, where this latter set is a filter if and only if  is a filter and  In particular, if  is a neighborhood basis at a point  in a topological space  having at least 2 points, then  is a prefilter on   This construction is used to define  in terms of prefilter convergence.

Using duality between ideals and dual ideals

For an example that uses this duality, suppose  is a map and  Define

which contains the empty set if and only if  does. Although  does not preserve properties of filters very well, if  is downward closed (resp. closed under finite unions, an ideal) then this will also be true for  Using the duality between ideals and dual ideals allows for a construction of the following filter.

Other examples

Example: The set  of all dense open subsets of a topological space is a proper –system and a prefilter. If the space is a Baire space, then the set of all countable intersections of dense open subsets is a –system and a prefilter that is finer than 

Example: The family  of all dense open sets of  having finite Lebesgue measure is a proper –system and a free prefilter.

Filters and nets

This section will describe the relationships between prefilters and nets in great detail because of how important these details are applying filters to topology − particularly in switching from utilizing nets to utilizing filters and vice verse − and because it to make it easier to understand later why subnets (with their most commonly used definitions) are not generally equivalent with "sub–prefilters".

Nets to prefilters

A net  is canonically associated with its prefilter of tails  

Prefilters to nets

A  is a pair  consisting of a non–empty set  and an element  
For any family  let 

Define a canonical preorder  on pointed sets by declaring 

If  even if  so this preorder is not antisymmetric and given any family of sets   is partially ordered if and only if  consists entirely of singleton sets. 
If  is a greatest element if and only if  in which case  is the set of all greatest elements. However, a greatest element  is a maximal element if and only if  so there is at most one element that is both maximal and greatest. 
There is a canonical map  defined by  

Although  is not, in general, a partially ordered set, it is a directed set if (and only if)  is a prefilter. 
So the most immediate choice for the definition of "the net in  induced by a prefilter " is the assignment  from  into 

This would not necessarily be true had  been defined on a proper subset of  
Worse still, while  is the unique  filter on  the prefilter  instead generates a  filter (that is, an ultrafilter) on 

Ultranets and ultra prefilters

this happens if and only if  is an ultra prefilter. 
A prefilter  is an ultra prefilter if and only if  is an ultranet in

Partially ordered net

The domain of the canonical net  is in general not partially ordered. However, in 1955 Bruns and Schmidt discovered a construction that allows for the canonical net to have a domain that is both partially ordered and directed; this was independently rediscovered by Albert Wilansky in 1970. 
For any  in  declare that  if and only if 

or equivalently, if and only if 

Unwinding these definitions gives the following characterization: 

which shows that  is just the lexicographical order on  induced by  where  is partially ordered by equality  
Both  are serial and neither possesses a greatest element or a maximal element; this remains true if they are each restricted to the subset of  defined by 

where it will henceforth be assumed that they are. 
Denote the assignment  from this subset by:

If  is a prefilter on  then  is a net in  whose domain  is a partially ordered set and moreover,  
If the set  is replaced with the positive rational numbers then the strict partial order  will also be a dense order.

Subordinate filters and subnets

The notion of " is subordinate to " (written ) is for filters and prefilters what " is a subsequence of " is for sequences. 

Non–equivalence of subnets and subordinate filters

An eventual set is necessarily not empty. A subset is eventual if and only if its complement is not frequent (which is termed ). 
A map  between two preordered sets is  if whenever 

Subnets in the sense of Willard and subnets in the sense of Kelley are the most commonly used definitions of "subnet." 
The first definition of a subnet was introduced by John L. Kelley in 1955. 
Stephen Willard introduced his own variant of Kelley's definition of subnet in 1970. 
AA–subnets were introduced independently by Smiley (1957), Aarnes and Andenaes (1972), and Murdeshwar (1983); AA–subnets were studied in great detail by Aarnes and Andenaes but they are not often used.

Kelley did not require the map  to be order preserving while the definition of an AA–subnet does away entirely with any map between the two nets' domains and instead focuses entirely on  − the nets' common codomain. 
Every Willard–subnet is a Kelley–subnet and both are AA–subnets. 
In particular, if  is a Willard–subnet or a Kelley–subnet of  then 

Example: Let  and let  be a constant sequence, say  Let  and  so that  is a net on  Then  is an AA-subnet of  because  But  is not a Willard-subnet of  because there does not exist any map  whose image is a cofinal subset of  Nor is  a Kelley-subnet of  because if  is any map then  is a cofinal subset of  but  is not eventually in 

AA–subnets have a defining characterization that immediately shows that they are fully interchangeable with sub(ordinate)filters. 
Explicitly, what is meant is that the following statement is true for AA–subnets:

If  are prefilters then  is an AA–subnet of 

If "AA–subnet" is replaced by "Willard–subnet" or "Kelley–subnet" then the above statement becomes . In particular, the problem is that the following statement is in general false:

 statement: If  are prefilters such that  is a Kelley–subnet of 

Since every Willard–subnet is a Kelley–subnet, this statement remains false if the word "Kelley–subnet" is replaced with "Willard–subnet".

: For all  let  Let  which is a proper –system, and let  where both families are prefilters on the natural numbers  
So ideally,  should be a subnet of  
Let  is both a maximal and greatest element of  
Consequently, any order–preserving map  must be eventually constant (with value ) where  is then a greatest element of the range  
Because  there exist  such that  
For every  because  is eventually in  it is necessary that  
Consequently,  is not a Kelley–subnet of 

If "subnet" is defined to mean Willard–subnet or Kelley–subnet then nets and filters are not completely interchangeable because there exists a filter–sub(ordinate)filter relationships that cannot be expressed in terms of a net–subnet relationship between the two induced nets. In particular, the problem is that Kelley–subnets and Willard–subnets are  fully interchangeable with subordinate filters. If the notion of "subnet" is not used or if "subnet" is defined to mean AA–subnet, then this ceases to be a problem and so it becomes correct to say that nets and filters are interchangeable. Despite the fact that AA–subnets do not have the problem that Willard and Kelley subnets have, they are not widely used or known about.

See also

Notes

Proofs

Citations

References

  
  
  
  
  
  
 
  
  
  
  
  
  
  
  
  
  
  
  
  
  
  
  
  (Provides an introductory review of filters in topology and in metric spaces.)
  
  
  
  
  
  
  
  
  

General topology
Order theory
Set theory